The UniTeam Alliance is an electoral alliance in the Philippines formed to support the candidacies of Bongbong Marcos and Sara Duterte in the 2022 presidential and vice-presidential elections and their allies in the 2022 Philippine general election. The alliance was formalized on November 29, 2021.

Coalition members 
The alliance consists of four political parties:

In addition, the alliance's senatorial slate features guest candidates from the Nacionalista Party, Kilusang Bagong Lipunan (KBL), Nationalist People's Coalition (NPC), PDP–Laban, and People's Reform Party (PRP). Except for the NPC, all of the aforementioned parties are allied with Marcos and Duterte.

Senatorial slate 

Marcos and Duterte have endorsed the following candidates for the 2022 Philippine Senate election, thus who are part of their "senatorial slate":

References 

2021 establishments in the Philippines
Political party alliances in the Philippines